Jean-Marie Catonné (born November 26, 1941 in Paris) is a French writer. He is the author of many books, among them La Tête étoilée (1996), Portraits volés (2001), Villa Les Mésanges bleues (2002), Double Je (2007) and several biographies, including one of the French-Lithuanian writer Romain Gary.

References

French male writers
1941 births
Living people
Writers from Paris
French biographers